"Eejit" is a slang term derived from a dialectal spelling of the Irish English and Scottish English pronunciation of "idiot". It is a word commonly used by natives of both Ireland and Scotland.

It can also refer to:
"Eejit", a song by Halou
Eejits, a play by Ron Hutchinson